Gerald "Jerry" Lawrence Shargel (October 5, 1944 – July 16, 2022) was an American defense attorney who was based in New York City and generally considered one of the best criminal defense lawyers in the country.

Early life and education
Shargel was born in New Brunswick, New Jersey, to Leo Shargel, a paint-and-wallpaper store proprietor, and Lillian Edenzon Shargel on October 5, 1944. He attended Bound Brook High School and graduated in 1966 from Rutgers University, where his mother worked as one of its math department’s secretaries, and in 1969 from Brooklyn Law School, joining the New York bar shortly thereafter.

Career
Shargel was widely regarded as one of the best criminal defense attorneys in New York. A 1998 profile in The New York Times referred to him as "regarded on Centre Street as a brilliant tactician and a very good trial lawyer with a successful white-collar practice". In receiving the Thurgood Marshall Award for Outstanding Criminal Law Practitioner by the New York State Association of Criminal Defense Lawyers in 2006, he was referred to as "one of the most brilliant criminal defense attorneys in America… quite possibly the finest of his generation".

In a 1991 federal case against the Gambino crime family, Shargel was initially slated to represent underboss Sammy Gravano. However, Judge I. Leo Glasser barred Shargel and Bruce Cutler from representing, respectively, Gravano and Gotti, agreeing with prosecutors' assertion that the lawyers were "in-house counsel" to the Gambinos. Prosecutors, including John Gleeson, contended that since Shargel and Cutler may have known about criminal activity, they were "part of the evidence" and liable to be called as witnesses.

Shargel's other high-profile clients included Daniel Pelosi, who was charged with and later convicted of the second-degree murder of East Hampton millionaire Ted Ammon, and Robert "Joe" Halderman in the matter of Halderman's extortion of television personality David Letterman. Shargel represented Halderman from October 2009 to March 9, 2010, when Halderman entered a plea-bargained guilty plea.

Shargel was well known for his courtroom style and dramatic presentations, which may have helped some of his clients to be found not guilty. For example, in 2005, Murder Inc. record label owners Irv and Chris Gotti (who are no relation to his aforementioned client John) were acquitted on all charges, possibly partially due to the effect of his courtroom demeanor on the jury—as there were a number of lively exchanges between him and NYPD detective Anthony Castiglia during testimony.

In 2012 Shargel defended  hip hop mogul James "Jimmy Henchman" Rosemond, CEO of Czar Entertainment, in a federal trial in Brooklyn, New York, presided over by Judge Gleeson. Rosemond was convicted on all charges (including cocaine distribution, conspiracy, money laundering, firearms possession, and witness tampering), and on October 25, 2013, he was sentenced to life imprisonment.

Shargel also taught criminal law classes at his alma mater, Brooklyn Law School, where he held the position of Practitioner-In-Residence, teaching courses on evidence, criminal procedure, and trial advocacy. He was also a frequent writer and commentator on legal issues that arise during high-profile criminal cases, which generate sustained national and regional media focus.

In 2018, he retired from active law practice, citing burnout.

Personal life
Shargel died from complications of Alzheimer’s disease at his residence in Manhattan on July 16, 2022, at the age of 77.

Notable clients
Amanda Bynes
New York State Senator Malcolm A. Smith of Queens
Texas oilman Oscar S. Wyatt, Jr. who pleaded guilty to paying kickbacks to the Hussein administration to gain access to Iraqi oil contracts
Restaurateur Jeffrey Chodorow
James Coonan
Gurmeet Singh Dhinsa, who was found guilty
Christopher "Chris Gotti" Lorenzo, co-founder of Murder Inc. who was acquitted of all charges against him
John Gotti
John Gotti's son, John A. Gotti
Joe Halderman
Daniel Pelosi
Marc Dreier, who was sentenced to 20 years in prison
Salvatore "Sammy the Bull" Gravano
James "Jimmy Henchman" Rosemond
Johnny "Machinegun Johnny" Eng

References

External links
 The Law Offices of Gerald L. Shargel
 Pelosi Trial: Profile of Gerald Shargel, from New York Newsday
 "No Mercy: Ronald Reagan's tough legal legacy"—Critical assessment of President Reagan's legacy by Gerald Shargel on Slate
 Gerald Shargel Quotes
 Interview with Jerry Shargel on CNN Live Sunday''

1944 births
2022 deaths
Bound Brook High School alumni
Brooklyn Law School alumni
Deaths from Alzheimer's disease
Deaths from dementia in New York (state)
New York (state) lawyers
People from New Brunswick, New Jersey
Rutgers University alumni